Zumwalt is a ghost town in Wallowa County, Oregon. It is located on the Zumwalt Prairie.

History
The name of the town came from Henry Zumwalt, an early resident of the area. The Zumwalt post office was established on August 25, 1903, and Josie Zumwalt was the first postmaster.

Henry Oliver Zumwalt was born on June 5, 1854, in Perrydale, Polk County, Oregon. He married Mary Angeline Updegraff on Aug 1881 in Wasco County, Oregon. Mary was born on November 15, 1853, in Shelbyville, Shelby County, Indiana. They had 4 children and the 3rd child was Josephine 'Josie' Irene Zumwalt. She was born on January 20, 1885, in Perrydale, Polk County, Oregon.

References

Unincorporated communities in Wallowa County, Oregon
Unincorporated communities in Oregon
Former populated places in Wallowa County, Oregon
Ghost towns in Oregon